Eureka is a town in Wayne County, North Carolina, United States.  The population was 197 at the 2010 census.  It is included in the Goldsboro, North Carolina Metropolitan Statistical Area.

History
The Eureka United Methodist Church was listed on the National Register of Historic Places in 1982.

Geography
Eureka is located at  (35.541699, -77.879121).

Demographics

As of the census of 2000, there were 244 people, 108 households, and 72 families residing in the town. The population density was 683.5 people per square mile (261.7/km2). There were 124 housing units at an average density of 347.3 per square mile (133.0/km2). The racial makeup of the town was 76.23% White and 23.77% African American. Hispanic or Latino of any race were 3.69% of the population.

There were 108 households, out of which 21.3% had children under the age of 18 living with them, 50.9% were married couples living together, 12.0% had a female householder with no husband present, and 33.3% were non-families. 32.4% of all households were made up of individuals, and 18.5% had someone living alone who was 65 years of age or older. The average household size was 2.24 and the average family size was 2.79.

In the town, the population was spread out, with 19.3% under the age of 18, 7.0% from 18 to 24, 23.4% from 25 to 44, 26.2% from 45 to 64, and 24.2% who were 65 years of age or older. The median age was 45 years. For every 100 females, there were 95.2 males. For every 100 females age 18 and over, there were 80.7 males.

The median income for a household in the town was $29,545, and the median income for a family was $36,250. Males had a median income of $26,500 versus $31,875 for females. The per capita income for the town was $14,396. About 9.1% of families and 11.6% of the population were below the poverty line, including 10.8% of those under the age of eighteen and 13.0% of those 65 or over.

Education
Education in Eureka is administered by the Wayne County Public School system with children attending schools in nearby townships. Higher education is offered through Wayne Community College in Goldsboro.

Transportation

Passenger
 Air: Eureka is served through nearby Kinston Regional Jetport  with service to Orlando, Florida. Raleigh-Durham International Airport is the closest major airport with service to more than 45 domestic and international destinations. Goldsboro-Wayne Municipal Airport is an airport located nearby, but is only used for general aviation.
 Interstate Highway: I-795 is the closest Interstate to Eureka, which is located 6.5 miles west in Fremont.
 Eureka is not served directly by passenger trains. The closest Amtrak station is located in Wilson.
 Bus: The area is served by Greyhound with a location in nearby Goldsboro.

Roads
 The main highways in Eureka are NC 111 and NC 222.

References

Towns in North Carolina
Towns in Wayne County, North Carolina